Leif Nilsson (born 10 July 1963) is a former Swedish footballer and coach. He made 124 Allsvenskan appearances for Djurgårdens IF between 1986 and 1992. After his active career, he was in the Djurgårdens IF organisation as youth coach.

Career
Nilsson joined Djurgårdens IF from Hudiksvalls ABK for the 1984 season and played with them until 1992. During his time in Djurgårdens IF, he was part of the 1989–90 Svenska Cupen winning team. He also played for Vasalunds IF and Gustavsbergs IF.

Honours

Club 

 Djurgårdens IF
 Division 2 Norra (1): 1985
 Svenska Cupen (1): 1989–90

References

Swedish footballers
Djurgårdens IF Fotboll players
Vasalunds IF players
Djurgårdens IF Fotboll non-playing staff
1963 births
Living people
Association football forwards